Entandrophragma excelsum, is  Africa's tallest indigenous tree native to tropical East Africa and occurs in eastern D.R.of the Congo, Rwanda, Burundi, Uganda, Tanzania, Malawi and Zambia. This species is scattered in areas of upland semi-deciduous forest, in mid-altitude and montane rainforest, at (925 –) 1280 – 2150 altitude. It is locally also found in riverine forest.

Description
Entandrophragma excelsum dioecious, deciduous large tree, commonly up to 45 (–60) m tall. Bole branchless for up to 27 m, straight and cylindrical, up to 200 (–250) cm in diameter, with large buttresses up to 5 m high.

This tree was discovered by Andreas Hemp at the University of Bayreuth in Germany, a researcher in plant systematics.

The ten known the tallest individuals of Entandrophragma excelsum ranged from 59.2 to 81.5 m and 1.24 to 2.55 m diameter.

Leaves pinnate on stalks to 60 cm or more with 8–16 large leaflets, almost opposite, each one oblong, 8 – 18 (–30) cm long and 4.5 – 8 (–14) cm wide. Inflorescence, 25 – 30 cm long and 10 – 15 cm wide. Flowers unisexual, tiny, white or pinkish white.

The wood is moderately lightweight, with a density of 460–530 kg/m3 at 12% moisture content.

Uses
The wood of Entandrophragma excelsum is not in much demand for local applications because it often warps and twists considerably upon drying. Moreover, it is not durable and not very attractively figured. Its occurrence in mountain regions often hampers commercial exploitation.

The wood is suitable for the production of sliced and rotary veneer, and can be made into plywood of satisfactory quality. The wood is suitable for construction, flooring, joinery, interior trim, furniture, cabinet work, musical instruments, vehicle bodies, toys, novelties, boxes, crates, carvings, turnery, veneer and plywood. The wood is used for fuel and to make charcoal.

Vernacular names 
Common local names for Entandrophragma excelsum tree: 
 in Luganda language: Muyovu
 in Kiga language: Mushalya, muyove
 in Rukonjo language: Kikula 
 in Runyankore language: Muyovu  
 in Rutoro language: Muyovu, muhungura
 in Swahili language: Mkukusu

See also 
 List of tallest trees
 The Big Tree

References

External links

 newscientist.com / Africa's tallest tree measuring 81m found on Mount Kilimanjaro, 30 November 2016
 books.google.co.uk / Flora of Tropical East Africa - Meliaceae, (1991); By Brian Thomas Styles, Frank White
 zambiaflora.com / Entandrophragma excelsum (Dawe & Sprague) Sprague
 monumentaltrees.com / E. excelsum in a gorge south of Kilimanjaro National Park in Barangata

excelsum
Trees of Africa
Afromontane flora